Lockton is a surname. Notable people with the surname include:

 David Lockton (born 1937), American entrepreneur
 David M. Lockton, American banker
 Joan Lockton (1903–?), British actress
 John Lockton (1892–1972), English sportsman